Francis Aungier may refer to:

 Francis Aungier, 1st Baron Aungier of Longford (1558–1632), Anglo-Irish judge
 Francis Aungier, 1st Earl of Longford (c. 1632–1700), Anglo-Irish politician

See also
Aungier (surname)